The 1998 Medic Drug Grand Prix of Cleveland was the tenth round of the 1998 CART FedEx Champ Car World Series season, held on July 12, 1998, at the Burke Lakefront Airport in Cleveland, Ohio. The race, once again was won by defending champion Alex Zanardi, who dominated the race once he passed his teammate and polesitter Jimmy Vasser (who was suffering from gearbox problems) on a restart. The win was Zanardi's third consecutive of the season.

Classification

Race

Caution flags

Lap Leaders

Point standings after race

References 

Grand Prix of Cleveland
Cleveland
Medic Drug Grand Prix
1990s in Cleveland
Medic Drug Grand Prix